Nébias is a commune in the Aude department in southern France.
Its inhabitants are called Nébiassais.

Geography 

The commune of Nébias  is crossed by the Atlantic-Mediterranean Drainage divide that separates the village in two halves. It is symbolized by a particular fountain. The area is under three different climatic influences : mediterranean, oceanic and alpine. The south of the commune (common beech-fir tree forest) is part of the forest of the :fr: pays de Sault. There is no river present in the area other than seasonal streams.

Coat of arms 

Heraldry of the commune : Sinople, a pale bretessé silver.

Population

Sites and monuments 

 Castle from the 13th century, modified until the 19th century, belonging to the de Mauléon family.
 Church very ancient, rebuilt in the late 19th century, one bell and two chandeliers as well as the altar table listed in the historical furniture register.
 Chapel Sainte-Claire from the 16th century with older non-dated foundations.
 Many fountains and communal lavoir within the village and the hamlet of Lafage (Round fountain-abreuvoir said "of the church", fountain-abreuvoir with 3 rectangular bassins said "of the Griffoul" below the village (south), very old twin bassin lavoir at the Lafage hamlet).
 The site of the windmill overlooking the village, starting point of the "Sentier Nature" contains very old remains. The ruins of two windmills restored in 1997 and 2003 as well as the fort of the Wehrmacht built for Anti-aircraft warfare in 1942.
 Do not miss the trek, forming a loop near Nébias, the Sentier Nature leading to the natural site of the Labyrinthe Vert. It consists into a meandering path across a very particular karstic maze, lost in a forest of oak and boxwood, among other mediterranean plants. Along the path, you will discover beautiful clearings. Human presence in this landscape is so ancient that the modern walker is following the footsteps of medieval shepherds and even beyond. Within the le Labyrinthe Vert you also can access the "Cami Salvatge" with its "named boulders", stay to meditate on "le Grand Lapiaz" (the Great rock field) or in the "Clot des Encantados" (the Fairies den), not far from the "Sapin Harpe" (harp fir tree).
Walking past the trek opened in 1987, you can reach the château de Puivert, either by a forest track bordering the Sentier Nature next to the Borde d'en Dominique, either by the sentier Cathare at the south coming from the chapelle Sainte-Claire.
 Scenic forest path of the lake du Tury leading to the Montmija observation platform (1000m) then further the one of the Sapin Géant (giant fir tree), in the domain forest of Callong.

See also
Communes of the Aude department

References

Communes of Aude
Aude communes articles needing translation from French Wikipedia